Swabhimani Shetkari Saghtana or SSS (Marathi: स्वभिमानी शेतकरी संघटना) is a farmers union based in Kolhapur, Maharashtra, India. It was founded by Member of Parliament, Raju Shetti.

They fight for the fair price of sugarcane farmer and other issues.

As of January 2014, Swabhimani Shetakari Sanghatana is part of the state's governing grand alliance, led by Shiv Sena and the Bhartiya Janata Party.

On 28 September 2015, the SSS was one of 16 parties in Maharashtra to lose its registration for not submitting audited balance sheets and IT return documents since 2005. Thus they have lost their official election symbols.

References

External links
 Official site
 amchi mati amchi mansa

Organisations based in Maharashtra
Agricultural organisations based in India
Agriculture in Maharashtra
Organizations with year of establishment missing